Sandra Metts (Ph.D) is a prominent interpersonal communication scholar and Professor Emeritus in the School of Communication at Illinois State University.

Metts has dedicated her academic career to the study of interpersonal and social communication. Her research areas include deception in close relationships, politeness, sexual communication, relationship engagement, and facework—face is a social identity that people construct during social interactions. A prolific scholar, Metts has published numerous articles, edited several top journals in her field, and co-authored multiple books. Her research and scholarship in interpersonal communication offers her “the opportunity to move beyond describing how meaning is created." She states, "I can actually offer an explanation of how communication functions in relationships and suggest ways that it can be improved.”

In an interview, she says that her research aims “to contribute to our growing knowledge of what makes relationships succeed or fail. Since we all have friendships, romances, and family ties, the relevance of my work is broad and, I hope, useful.” In addition Metts states all her responsibilities as a teacher are of importance, even the tasks that she may grumble through such a grading exams or putting together effective course packets. She finds her work as a teacher very rewarding. “I guess the most meaningful to me is providing students with the opportunity to have better lives, personally and professionally, to be in control of their communication rather than a victim of it, and to be able to appreciate and facilitate the communication efforts of other people.”

Education
Metts completed both of her Bachelor of Arts degrees (in English Education and Sociology) from Western Washington University. She has a total of three master's degrees: one in American Literature from the University of Washington, another in Art History from Bowling Green University and a third in Performance Studies from the University of Northern Iowa. She earned her Ph.D. in Communication Research from the University of Iowa. In 1983 Metts joined the faculty at Illinois State University, where she remained until her retirement in 2014. Metts still teaches courses in interpersonal communication as an emerita professor.

Awards and honors
In 2013, Dr. Metts was inducted into the Central States Communication Association's (CSCA) Hall of Fame - the highest honor bestowed by the organization - for her commitment to scholarship, mentoring, and service in the field of Communication. In 2013, Metts was also awarded the CSCA Outstanding Mentor Award for her commitment to mentoring students and faculty in the discipline.

Metts served as the CSCA Vice President from 1997-1998 and president from 1998-1999. In 1997, she received the College of Arts and Sciences Lecturer Award.

She has also garnered numerous teaching awards throughout her career including Illinois State University's Outstanding Teacher Award in 2002-03, the College’s Outstanding Teacher Award in 1989, the International Society for the Study of Personal Relationships Outstanding Teacher Award in 2000, and the Central States Communication Association Outstanding New Teacher Award in 1985.

Publications
Self-Disclosure by Valerian Derlega, Sandra M. Metts, Sandra Petronio and Stephen T. Margulis (1993) 
Facework by William R. Cupach and Sandra M. Metts (1994) 
Readings in Language & Communication: Interpersonal and Small Group Contexts by Elizabeth R. Lamoureux and Sandra Mae Metts (1996) 
Sexual Communication (An entry from Macmillan Reference USA's International Encyclopedia of Marriage and Family) by Sandra Metts and James Jaccard (2003) 
An Interview with Gerald Miller (An article from: Communication Studies) by Sandra Metts (2005)

Published Research
Bowers, J. W., Metts, S. M., & Duncanson, W. T. (1985). Emotion and interpersonal communication. Handbook of interpersonal communication, 500-550. 
Metts, S. M. (1986). A Rules Analysis of Conversational Narratives. University Microfilms.

References

Illinois State University faculty
Living people
University of Iowa alumni
Year of birth missing (living people)
Communication scholars